Gidi Blues popularly known as Lagos Love Story is a 2016 Nigerian romantic film produced and directed by Nigerian film makers Femi Odugbemi and Hauwa Allahbura.

The movie stars Gideon Okeke, Hauwa Allahbura, Lepacious Bose, Daniel Lloyd, Nancy Isime, Bukky Wright, Tina Mba, Segun Obadare-Akpata, Toyin Oshinaike, William Ekpo,  Banky W, Aduke Anikulapo and Jahman Anikulapo.

Premiere 
The movie premiered in June 2016 in collaboration with African Magic at The Federal Palace Hotel & Casino, Victoria Island, Lagos. Apart from the crew, other  personalities who attended were Olu Jacobs and wife Joke Silva, Patrick Doyle, Meg Otanwa, Yeni Kuti, Tunde Kelani, Olisa Adibua, Toyin Akinosho, Jahman Anikulapo, Awam Amkpa.

Synopsis 
The romantic movie revolves around a playboy— Akin —from a rich family and a beautiful dedicated young lady. They met in an unpredictable place and their encounter created a windstorm experience that unravel the world of Akin.

Cast   
 Hauwa Allahbura as Nkem Nochiri
 Jahman Anikulapo as Concert MC 
 Lepacious Bose	as Simbi
 Ibeh Breakthrough	as Jerry
 Ibrahim Drago as Sodiq
 William Ekpo as Bishop Onilude 
 Nancy Isime as Carmen Onilude
 Folashade Kareem as Sodiq's Mother
 Daniel Lloyd as Jaiye Thomas
 Tina Mba as Mrs. Onilude
 Segun Obadare-Akpata as Big Bald Guy
 Steve Ogundele as Doctor
 Gideon  Okeke	as Akinola Kuti
 Shade Omoniyi	as Liquor Seller and Lepa Shandy
 Toyin Oshinaike as Boatman
 Babatunde Sanni as Sodiq's Father
 Bukky Wright as Mrs. Kuti.

Awards and nominations 
In 2017, the film was nominated for Nollywood Paris Award.

References 

2016 films
Nigerian romance films